The Incarnate Word Cardinals men's basketball team represents the University of the Incarnate Word in San Antonio, Texas, United States. They are currently led by fifth-year head coach Carson Cunningham. Beginning in 2013, the Cardinals made the jump to NCAA Division I and joined the Southland Conference. As part of their transition from Division II to Division I, they were not eligible for postseason play until 2018. They play their home games at the McDermott Convocation Center.

Postseason

CIT results
The Cardinals have appeared in the CollegeInsider.com Postseason Tournament (CIT) one time. They have a record of 0–1. The 2015 CIT was their first postseason appearance since joining Division I.

NCAA Division II Tournament results
The Cardinals have appeared in the NCAA Division II Tournament three times. Their combined record is 1–3.

References

External links
Website